The Peerage of the United Kingdom is one of the five Peerages in the United Kingdom. It comprises most peerages created in the United Kingdom of Great Britain and Ireland after the Acts of Union in 1801, when it replaced the Peerage of Great Britain. New peers continued to be created in the Peerage of Ireland until 1898 (the last creation was the Barony of Curzon of Kedleston).

The House of Lords Act 1999 reformed the House of Lords. Until then, all peers of the United Kingdom were automatically members of the House of Lords. However, from that date, most of the hereditary peers ceased to be members, whereas the life peers retained their seats. All hereditary peers of the first creation (i.e. those for whom a peerage was originally created, as opposed to those who inherited a peerage), and all surviving hereditary peers who had served as Leader of the House of Lords, were offered a life peerage to allow them to continue to sit in the House should they wish.

Peers in the Peerage of Scotland and Peerage of Ireland did not have an automatic seat in the House of Lords following the Acts of Union of 1707 and 1800, though the law permitted a limited number to be elected by their fellows to serve in the House of Lords as representative peers. Some peerages of the United Kingdom were created to get around this obstacle and allow certain Scottish and Irish peers to enjoy the automatic right to sit in the House of Lords.

Key

Ranks
The ranks of the peerage are Duke, Marquess, Earl, Viscount, and Baron.

The last non-royal dukedom was created in 1900, and the last marquessate was created in 1936. Creation of the remaining ranks, except baronies for life, mostly ceased once Harold Wilson's Labour government took office in 1964, and only thirteen (nine non-royal and four royal) people have been created hereditary peers since then. These were:

Dukes in the Peerage of the United Kingdom

Marquesses in the Peerage of the United Kingdom

Earls in the Peerage of the United Kingdom

Viscounts in the Peerage of the United Kingdom

Barons in the Peerage of the United Kingdom

Extinct peerages since the Passage of the House of Lords Act 1999

Extinct dukedoms

Extinct earldoms

Extinct viscountcies

Extinct baronies

Current titles without heirs

Current UK Peers

Current Scottish and Irish peers with British titles

Peerages in remainder to other Peerages

Titles

Marquesses, earls, viscounts and barons are all addressed as 'Lord X', where 'X' represents either their territory or surname pertaining to their title. Marchionesses, countesses, viscountesses and baronesses are all addressed as 'Lady X'. Dukes and duchesses are addressed just as 'Duke' or 'Duchess' or, in a non-social context, 'Your Grace'.

Lists of peers
 29 Dukes: see List of dukes in the peerages of Britain and Ireland
 34 Marquesses: see List of marquesses in the peerages of Britain and Ireland
 190 Earls and countesses: see List of earls in the peerages of Britain and Ireland
 111 Viscounts: see List of viscounts in the peerages of Britain and Ireland
 443 Hereditary Barons: see List of barons in the peerages of Britain and Ireland
 Women: see List of peerages created for women and List of peerages inherited by women

See also
 British nobility
 Dukes in the United Kingdom
 History of the British peerage
 Marquesses in the United Kingdom
 Peerage of England
 Peerage of Great Britain
 Peerage of Ireland
 Peerage of Scotland
 Peerages in the United Kingdom

Notes

References

Citations

Sources 

The Roll of the Peerage, The Crown Office, Ministry of Justice

 
United Kingdom